A sketch story, literary sketch or simply sketch, is a piece of writing that is generally shorter than a short story, and contains very little, if any, plot. The genre was invented after the 16th century in England, as a result of increasing public interest in realistic depictions of "exotic" locales. The term was most popularly used in the late nineteenth century. As a literary work, it is also often referred to simply as the sketch.

Style
A sketch is mainly descriptive, either of places (travel sketch) or of people (character sketch). Writers of sketches like Washington Irving clearly used the artist as a model. A sketch story is a hybrid form. It may contain little or no plot, instead describing impressions of people or places, and is often informal in tone.

In the nineteenth century, sketch stories were frequently published in magazines, before falling out of favor. Such stories may focus on individual moments, leaving the reader to imagine for themselves the events that led to this occasion and to wonder what events will follow. Writers from Sherwood Anderson to John Updike used this form, often as a hybrid. In short, a sketch story aims at "suggestiveness rather than explicitness".

Modern usage
In modern usage, the term "short story" embraces what was once popularly termed "the sketch". Short stories of extreme brevity still exist under the names flash fiction or microfiction.

Popular writers of sketch stories

References

Sketch story